The Shire of Cambooya was a local government area in the Darling Downs region of Queensland, Australia, immediately south of the regional city of Toowoomba.

Its main pursuits included dairying and beef cattle, pig production, horse spelling and breeding, grain growing and vegetable production. The northern section, containing rural-residential suburbs such as Vale View and Hodgson Vale, are commuter districts within  of Toowoomba's urban core.

History 
The Shire of Cambooya was created by severance from the Shire of Clifton. It absorbed part of the Tarampa Shire in 1915, and part of Drayton in 1949.

Cambooya had four divisions electing two councillors each, with a separately elected mayor.

On 15 March 2008, under the Local Government (Reform Implementation) Act 2007 passed by the Parliament of Queensland on 10 August 2007, the Shire of Cambooya merged with the City of Toowoomba and the Shires of Clifton, Crows Nest, Jondaryan, Millmerran, Pittsworth and Shire of Rosalie to form the Toowoomba Region.

Towns and localities 
The Shire of Cambooya includes the following settlements:

 Cambooya
 East Greenmount
 Finnie1
 Greenmount
 Hodgson Vale1
 Mount Rascal1
 Nobby2
 Top Camp1
 Vale View1
 Westbrook
 Wyreema3

1 - split with the former City of Toowoomba
2 - split with the former Shire of Clifton
3 - split with the former Shire of Jondaryan

Population

# The estimated 1947 population of the post-1949 area was 1,959.

Chairmen and mayors
The leaders of the Cambooya Shire Council were:

Chairmen
 1914—1916: Arthur Hoey Davis, better known as the author Steele Rudd
 1916:	James Purcell
 1916—1918:	Edward Fitzgerald
 1918—1919:	Timothy O'Rourke
 1919—1920:	William Purcell
 1920—1921:	Malcolm Brodie
 1921—1923:	James Lemon
 1924—1939:	Edward Fitzgerald
 1939—1943:	Samuel John Gilmour
 1943—1949:	William Henry Lipp
 1949—1966:	Leslie Ashby Free
 1966—1973:	George Gordon Savage
 1973—1976:	George Hannaford
 1976—1982:	George Gordon Savage
 1982—1985:	William Archibald Woods
 1985—1993:	Thomas Stratford Newman

Mayors
 1993-2000:	Robert Leslie Free
 2000-2004:	John Gordon Savage
 2004-2008:	Carol Estelle Taylor

References

External links
 University of Queensland: Queensland Places: Cambooya Shire
 

Former local government areas of Queensland
Darling Downs
Toowoomba
Populated places established in 1914
2008 disestablishments in Australia
Populated places disestablished in 2008